Back Roads is an album by guitarist Pat Donohue.

Track listing 
All songs by Pat Donohue unless otherwise noted
 "Stealin' from Chet" (Chet Atkins, Pat Donohue) – 3:44
 "The Road to Kingdome Come" – 3:33
 "(The Other End Of) The Mississippi River Blues" – 4:11
 "Baby, Can't Get Over You" – 4:13
 "I Don't Worry 'Bout the Blues" – 4:24
 "Touch 'Em All" – 3:04
 "Saguaro Slide" – 2:47
 "Love and Desire" – 4:30
 "Nothin'" – 2:44
 "Stumblin' Through" – 3:58
 "Matter of Time" – 3:19
 "Summer's End" – 2:03

Personnel 
 Pat Donohue – guitar, vocals, slide guitar, percussion
 Rich Dworsky – piano
 Butch Thompson – clarinet, piano
 Howard Levy – harmonica
 Chet Atkins – guitar, vocals
 Gordy Johnson – double bass
 Marc Anderson – percussion
 Kate McKenzie – harmony vocals

References 

2003 albums
Pat Donohue albums